This is a list of actors who have appeared in the long-running British science fiction television series, Doctor Who. For other related lists see below.

Series main cast 

The following tables are an overview of all the regular cast members that have appeared throughout the show since 1963.

1963–1973
William Hartnell, Carole Ann Ford, William Russell and Jacqueline Hill first appeared as the Doctor, Susan Foreman, Ian Chesterton and Barbara Wright respectively in the show's debut serial; An Unearthly Child. Ford departed in The Dalek Invasion of Earth in 1964 and was replaced by Maureen O'Brien playing a character called Vicki. Russell and Hill departed together the following year in The Chase and were subsequently replaced by Peter Purves as Steven Taylor. Adrienne Hill took over from O'Brien for a short period of time as Katarina. Jean Marsh subsequently played the character of Sara Kingdom also for a short period of time before being replaced by Jackie Lane as Dodo Chaplet in The Ark in 1966. Purves and Lane stepped down from their roles at around the same time and were replaced by Anneke Wills and Michael Craze who played Polly and Ben Jackson. Patrick Troughton took over from Hartnell in the fourth season as the Second Doctor and starred alongside Wills and Craze and, after they stepped down, Deborah Watling, Frazer Hines and Wendy Padbury who respectively played Victoria Waterfield, Jamie McCrimmon and Zoe Heriot. At the end of The War Games, Troughton was replaced by Jon Pertwee who began his run as the Third Doctor alongside Caroline John as Liz Shaw in the 1970 serial; Spearhead from Space. John departed after Inferno and Katy Manning as Jo Grant, her replacement, appeared in the following serial Terror of the Autons. Throughout Pertwee's run, Nicholas Courtney, Richard Franklin and John Levene made regular appearances as The Brigadier, Mike Yates and Sergeant Benton respectively.

1974–1981
Katy Manning stepped down from the role of Jo Grant at the end of the tenth season in The Green Death. She was replaced by Elisabeth Sladen in The Time Warrior as Sarah Jane Smith. Jon Pertwee was subsequently replaced by Tom Baker at the end of Season 11 in Planet of the Spiders. Nicholas Courtney and John Levene reprised their roles as the Brigadier and Sergeant Benton numerous times during Baker's run. The Fourth Doctor and Sarah Jane were joined on their adventures by Harry Sullivan, played by Ian Marter, before he left them in Terror of the Zygons. After one more season, Sladen left the role of Sarah Jane Smith in the 1976 serial; The Hand of Fear. Louise Jameson debuted in The Face of Evil portraying a character called Leela. They were joined by K-9 in The Invisible Enemy, a robotic dog voiced by John Leeson and, on a few occasions; David Brierly. Jameson was replaced by Mary Tamm, who played Romana, a Time Lady and one of the Doctor's own species. Tamm stayed on for just one season before her character regenerated in Destiny of the Daleks and was portrayed by Lalla Ward. Baker, Ward and Leeson were joined by Matthew Waterhouse, the actor who played Adric, in Full Circle. Romana and K-9 departed together in Warriors' Gate. The 1981 serial Logopolis was the first to introduce Sarah Sutton and Janet Fielding as Nyssa and Tegan Jovanka respectively, but the last to star Tom Baker as the Doctor.

1982–1996
Peter Davison starred as the Fifth Doctor starting in the nineteenth season alongside Matthew Waterhouse, Sarah Sutton and Janet Fielding, before Waterhouse departed when Adric was dramatically killed off in Earthshock. In Mawdryn Undead, a new companion called Vislor Turlough was introduced, played by Mark Strickson. Sutton stepped down from the role of Nyssa in Terminus and Kamelion, an unusual robotic character voiced by Gerald Flood, was introduced in The King's Demons.

For The Five Doctors – the show's 20th anniversary special – Carole Ann Ford, Nicholas Courtney, Elisabeth Sladen, Lalla Ward, Wendy Padbury, Caroline John, Richard Franklin, John Leeson and Frazer Hines reprised their roles as, respectively, Susan Foreman, Brigadier Lethbridge-Stewart, Sarah Jane Smith, Romana, Zoe Heriot, Liz Shaw, Mike Yates, K-9 and Jamie McCrimmon. The special was broadcast between the twentieth and twenty-first seasons.

Davison, Fielding and Strickson continued on until Fielding stepped down from the role in Resurrection of the Daleks. She was replaced in Planet of Fire by Nicola Bryant as Peri Brown, a serial which also marked the final appearance of Strickson and Flood. Davison was replaced by Colin Baker in The Caves of Androzani and Bryant was replaced with Bonnie Langford as Mel Bush, a few years later, after her character was killed off in Mindwarp. Sylvester McCoy took over from Baker in Time and the Rani and Langford was replaced by Sophie Aldred as Ace at the end of the twenty-fourth season. The series was axed in 1989, but a TV movie was made in 1996 which saw Paul McGann taking over from McCoy and Daphne Ashbrook making her first and only appearance as Grace Holloway.

2005–2011 
Christopher Eccleston and Billie Piper made their debut appearances as The Doctor and Rose Tyler in the first episode of the revived series. Eccleston made his final appearance at the end of the first series, in which he was replaced by David Tennant. The following series saw Piper stepping down of her role in "Doomsday". Freema Agyeman and Catherine Tate appeared as regular companions in the third and fourth series', playing Martha Jones and Donna Noble respectively. David Tennant departed in the two-part story "The End of Time" with Matt Smith replacing him as the Doctor. In the following fifth series, he was joined by Karen Gillan as Amy Pond. The fifth series also saw the introduction of Rory Williams, played by Arthur Darvill.

2011–2017 
Matt Smith continued his role throughout the entirety of the seventh series and the following specials. Claire Skinner starred as Madge Arwell in the Christmas special that preceded series seven. This special also saw Gillan and Darvill make guest appearances. The two then returned for the first part of the series before departing in "The Angels Take Manhattan". Jenna-Louise Coleman also made a guest appearance as Oswin Oswald in the series opener, "Asylum of the Daleks". She then succeeded Gillan and Darvill beginning with a role in "The Snowmen" as Clara Oswin Oswald. Coleman played a third iteration of the character named Clara Oswald throughout the second half of the series.Alex Kingston continued to recur in the series. Beginning with the subsequent specials Coleman dropped "Louise" from her acting name. The first special celebrating the fiftieth anniversary of the series was titled "The Day of the Doctor" and saw the return of David Tennant and Billie Piper. Christopher Eccleston was initially set to return in the special as well but was later replaced by John Hurt, who played an incarnation of the Doctor not previously known. Gillan made a brief cameo appearance in the second and final special, "The Time of the Doctor". This episode also saw the departure of Smith.

Peter Capaldi was named as Smith's replacement to portray the Twelfth Doctor and debuted his first full episode in "Deep Breath". Capaldi made a cameo appearance in "The Day of the Doctor" and a guest appearance at the end of "The Time of the Doctor" after being cast in the role. He had also previously appeared in the Doctor Who episode "The Fires of Pompeii" and in the third series of spin-off series Torchwood, roles which were later connected to the Twelfth Doctor. Smith also held a minor role in "Deep Breath" in an appearance that was filmed prior to his departure. Coleman returned once more for the eighth and ninth series before exiting in "Hell Bent". Michelle Gomez appeared throughout the eighth series as an unknown character that was later revealed to be the next incarnation of the Master, this time going by Missy. Gomez also appeared in the two-part ninth series premiere. The Christmas special that bridged the two series featured an appearance by Nick Frost as Santa Claus, a role that was introduced through a cameo in the eighth series finale.

Coleman's departure was followed by two Christmas specials ahead of the tenth series, the first of which featured a final appearance by Kingston and the second featuring the return of Matt Lucas as Nardole from the first, but this time in a starring role. Lucas continued this role through the end of the tenth series which also saw the introduction of Pearl Mackie portraying Bill Potts. Gomez recurred once more in the series and Simm reprised his role alongside Gomez in tenth series finale. The "Twice Upon a Time" Christmas special included the departure of both Capaldi and Mackie from the series. It also so one-off appearances by David Bradley who had been cast as the First Doctor and Mark Gatiss as The Captain. Bradley was first introduced in the final episode of the tenth series. Coleman and Lucas both made guest appearances in the special as well. The Thirteenth Doctor, portrayed by Jodie Whittaker, was introduced at the end of the episode.

Since 2018 
Whittaker's first series as the Thirteenth Doctor began its broadcast in late 2018. Bradley Walsh, Tosin Cole and Mandip Gill replaced Mackie and Lucas as the companions for the show. The twelfth series saw the reintroduction of the Master, this time played by Sacha Dhawan who recurred across the series. Meanwhile, John Barrowman's Captain Jack Harkness briefly returned to Doctor Who in "Fugitive of the Judoon", after a ten year absence from the series, and starred in the 2021 New Year's Day special, "Revolution of the Daleks". "Fugitive of the Judoon" also introduced a new, previously unknown, incarnation of the Doctor referred to as the Fugitive Doctor portrayed by Jo Martin, a role that carried over into the thirteenth series and subsequent specials.

Walsh and Cole left the series following "Revolution of the Daleks", and were succeeded by John Bishop for the thirteenth series. Whittaker, Gill, and Bishop continued their roles through the 2022 specials; Whittaker then departed alongside Gill, and Bishop. The final special, "The Power of the Doctor", commemorating the BBC's centenary, saw the return of David Bradley, Peter Davison, Colin Baker, Sylvester McCoy, and Paul McGann as the First, Fifth, Sixth, Seventh, and Eighth doctors, respectfully. Sophie Aldred and Janet Fielding also starred in the episode, reprising their roles as Ace and Tegan Jovanka. Walsh briefly returned in the episode as well, with William Russell, Katy Manning, and Bonnie Langford portraying former companions Ian Chesterton, Jo Grant, and Mel Bush. Chesterson potentially broke a Guinness World Record for "longest gap between TV appearances as the same character" with over 57 years since his last appearance in 1965.

On 8 May 2022, Ncuti Gatwa was cast as the Fourteenth Doctor. David Tennant and Catherine Tate were also announced to be returning to the series in a similar set of specials airing in 2023 to commemorate the 60th anniversary of the series. Following Tennant's re-introduction to the series at the end of "The Power of the Doctor" it was revealed that Gatwa would actually be playing the Fifteenth Doctor while Tennant would hold the role of the Fourteenth. Bernard Cribbins is also set to appear in the 2023 specials as Wilfred Mott in a posthumous role because of Cribbins death after completing filming. Gatwa will then assume the role from Tennant; Gatwa's first full episode will premiere "over the festive period in 2023", and the fourteenth series will be screened in 2024.

Recurring appearances
Actors with roles which they have reprised over multiple episodes or stories without being part of the main cast.

A

B

C

D

E

F

G

H

J

K

L

M

N

O

P

R

S

T

V

W

Y

Guest appearances
This is a list of actors who have made guest appearances in Doctor Who. These actors were well-known names at the time of their appearance in the series, which frequently caused interest in the media towards the latest story. Actors who became famous after their Doctor Who appearance are not present in this list.

First Doctor stories

Second Doctor stories

Third Doctor stories

Fourth Doctor stories

Fifth Doctor stories

Sixth Doctor stories

Seventh Doctor stories

Eighth Doctor television movie

Ninth Doctor stories

Tenth Doctor stories

Eleventh Doctor stories

Twelfth Doctor stories

Thirteenth Doctor stories

See also
 Companion (Doctor Who)

References

Cast
Doctor Who
Doctor Who